This is a list of heads of state of Chad since the country gained independence from France in 1960 to the present day.

A total of six people have served as head of state of Chad (not counting two Interim Heads of State). Additionally, one person, Goukouni Oueddei, has served on two non-consecutive occasions.

The current head of state of Chad is Mahamat Déby, since 20 April 2021, when he took power in a military coup following the death of his father, President Idriss Déby. Mahamat Déby was President of the Transitional Military Council, a military junta, from 20 April 2021 until 10 October 2022, when he was sworn is as Transitional President of the Republic following a "national dialogue".

Titles
 1960–1962: Head of State
 1962–1975: President of the Republic
 1975: Chairman of the Supreme Military Council
 1975–1978: Head of State
 1978–1979: President of the Republic
 1979: Chairman of the Provisional Council of State
 1979: President of the Transitional Government of National Unity
 1979: Chairman of the Provisional Administrative Committee
 1979–1982: President of the Transitional Government of National Unity
 1982: Chairman of the Command Council of the Armed Forces of the North
 1982: Chairman of the Council of State
 1982–1990: President of the Republic
 1990: President of the Patriotic Salvation Movement
 1990–1991: President of the Council of State
 1991–2021: President of the Republic
 2021–2022: President of the Transitional Military Council
 2022–present: President of the Republic

Key
Political parties

Other factions

Status

List of officeholders

Timeline

Latest election

See also
 Politics of Chad
 List of prime ministers of Chad
 Vice President of Chad
 List of colonial governors of Chad

Notes

References

External links
 World Statesmen – Chad

Chad
 
Political history of Chad
Politics of Chad
1962 establishments in Chad
Heads of state
Heads of state